Manuel Aguirre may refer to:

Manuel Aguirre, 20th-century Mexican general and leader of the Escobarista rebellion
Manuel Aguirre de Tejada (1827–1911), Spanish politician
Manuel Aguirre Geisse, Minister of Health of Chile for three weeks in February 1950
Manuel Aguirre y Monsalbe (1822–1856), Spanish painter
Manuel Aguirre (rugby union) (born 1959), Argentine rugby union player
Manuel Bernardo Aguirre (1908–1999), Mexican politician
Manuel Aguirre, a character in Rebelde Way, an Argentine telenovela